Cuango is a corregimiento in Santa Isabel District, Colón Province, Panama with a population of 442 as of 2010. Its population as of 1990 was 159; its population as of 2000 was 331.

References

Corregimientos of Colón Province
Road-inaccessible communities of Panama